Buga may refer to:

Places
 Mount Buga, an inactive volcano in Zamboanga del Sur province, the Philippines
 Buga (barangay), a barangay in San Miguel Municipality, Bulacan, Philippines
 Buga, Valle del Cauca, city and municipality in the Colombian department of Valle del Cauca
 Bugalagrande, city and municipality in the Valle del Cauca Department, also spelled as a conjoined name of Buga-La-Grande (Buga the Great)

Other uses
 Buga (god), Evenk god of the heaven
 Buga (surname)
 Buhay, musical instrument
 Hungarian Buga Pigeon
 BUGA, the biannual Federal horticulture show in Germany
 Buga-khwe or Buga-kxoe, a dialect of Khwe language

See also
 
 Buğa (disambiguation)

es:Buga